René Joseph Hall (September 26, 1912 ‒ February 11, 1988) was an American guitarist and arranger.   He was among the most important behind the scenes figures in early rock and roll, but his career spanned the period from the late 1920s to the late 1980s, and encompassed multiple musical styles.

Biography
Born in Morgan City, Louisiana, René Hall first recorded in 1933 as a banjo player with Joseph Robichaux in New Orleans. He then worked around the country as a member of the Ernie Fields Orchestra, with whom he made his earliest recordings. In the group he was known by the nickname Lightnin' . Later he joined Earl Hines as musical arranger. During the 1940s he built up a considerable reputation as a session musician in New York City. In the late 1940s, he formed his own sextet which recorded for various labels including Jubilee, Decca, and RCA. He also worked as a talent scout for King Records, discovering such acts as Billy Ward and the Dominoes.

In the mid-1950s, Hall moved to Los Angeles, California, and began doing session work with saxophone player, Plas Johnson, and drummer, Earl Palmer. The trio recorded for many of the emerging rock and roll and R&B artists on such labels as Aladdin, Rendezvous, and Specialty Records. In 1958, he pioneered the usage of a Danelectro 6-string bass guitar as a supplement to standup bass on recording sessions with Ritchie Valens and others. This approach was widely imitated by arrangers all over the world.

Hall was a virtual one-man dynasty on the West Coast from the mid-1950s through the early 1970s, organizing such studio concoctions as B. Bumble & The Stingers hit "Nut Rocker", surf-rock group The Marketts (“Surfer’s Stomp”), and The Routers of “Let’s Go” fame. All featured Hall, Palmer and Johnson, but were then promoted by young white groups who performed the songs on tour. He gave his former employer Ernie Fields an unlikely rock hit with a version of the big band standard, "In The Mood", which reached #4 in Billboard during 1959. When Hall, Palmer, and Johnson did not want to issue it under their own names and tour behind it, they gave it to Fields, who then did join them in the studio for a follow up hit.

Hall arranged Ike & Tina Turner's 1963 album Don't Play Me Cheap. He also arranged some of Sam Cooke's best-known recordings including the 1964 song, "A Change Is Gonna Come", in which Hall devised a dramatic arrangement with a symphonic overture for strings, kettledrum, and French horn. He prepared arrangements for many successful artists including The Impressions and Marvin Gaye. He also played guitar on Marvin Gaye's "Let's Get It On" and did a lot of work for Bobby Womack.

René Hall died of heart disease in Los Angeles, California at the age of 75.

Selected discography

Singles 

 1952: René Hall – "Let's Turn The Lights Down Low" / "Must I" (RCA Victor 4881)
 1957: René Hall's Orchestra Featuring Willie Joe / René Hall's Orchestra – "Twitchy" / "Flippin'" (Specialty 618)
 1958: René Hall's Orchestra – "Saints Go Marchin' In" / "Thunderbird" (Specialty 629)
 1958: René Hall's Orchestra – "Frankie And Johnny" / "Cleo" (Specialty 641)
 1959: René Hall – "Smitty's Toy Piano" / "South Gate" (Arvee A 580)
 1959: René Hall And His Guitars – "Moritat" / "Adalene" (Rendezvous No. 107)
 1959: The Skunks And Rene Hall / Rene Hall – "Smitty's Xmas Toy Piano" / "Smitty's Toy Piano" (Arvee A 585)
 1960: René Hall Orchestra – "La Cubalibra" / "The Untouchables" (Del-Fi 4135)
 René Hall Orchestra – "Night Fright" / "Turf" (Castil 101)

Work with other artists

Collaborations
 Twistin' the Night Away - Sam Cooke (1962)
 Night Beat - Sam Cooke (1963)
 Ain't That Good News - Sam Cooke (1964)
 All I Really Want to Do - Cher (1965)
 Venice Blue - Bobby Darin (1965)

References

External links

American music arrangers
Jubilee Records artists
RCA Victor artists
Decca Records artists
Specialty Records artists
1912 births
1988 deaths
People from Morgan City, Louisiana
20th-century American musicians
African-American male guitarists
Musicians from Louisiana
20th-century American male musicians
20th-century African-American musicians